Rud Ab-e Bala (also Romanized as , , and ; also known as Rood Ab, Rūd Āb, Rūd-e Āb, and Rūd Āb-e ‘Olyā) is a village in Garmsar Rural District, Jebalbarez-e Jonubi District, Anbarabad County, Kerman Province, Iran. At the 2006 census, its population was 567, in 110 families.

References 

Populated places in Anbarabad County